The National Institute of Price Stabilization (Spanish: Instituto Nacional de Estabilización de Precios) better known for its acronym in Spanish, INESPRE, was created by the law No.526, issued by the Executive Power of the Dominican Republic, on December 11, 1969.

The National Institute of Price Stabilization offers support and provides services inside the national system of agricultural commercialization  to improve the profitability and competitiveness of agricultural producers, and increase the purchase power of local consumers.

Currently, INESPRE is directed by Jorge Radhamés Zorrilla Ozuna, who was designated by President Danilo Medina on August 20, 2012 by the decree No. 468-12, article 2.

History 
When INESPRE was created, its main activities were:
 Merchandising and acquisition of products directly from local producers, to intervene in the price of the market.
 Stimulate production by increasing the income of producers.
 Administrate social programs for the distribution of agricultural products.
 Regulate activities that improve the merchandising of agricultural products, and provide information to producers about the prices of the products in the institution and in the domestic and international market.

Objectives 
General:
 Implement a transparent system of agricultural merchandising that guarantees the market stability of agricultural products.

Specific:
 Reinforce the role of the institution as a coordinator and facilitator of agricultural merchandising, to help solve conflicts between interest groups.
 Increase the offer of agricultural products through its Producers’ Markets (Spanish: Mercados de Productores).
 Increase the number of Producers' Markets to supply the country with quality products at affordable prices.
 Strengthen the market information system to guarantee that producers have clear expectations of price variations in the market.
 Improve the competitiveness of the agricultural sector through the development of a capacitation plan on better agricultural practices.

Directors

2012-2016 Administration 
During the current administration, Jorge Radhamés Zorrilla Ozuna has developed important initiatives to help local producers, consumers, and the institution which has contributed to improve the financial situation of producers, consumers, and suppliers.

The new philosophy of the institution is to “offer support and services in the national agricultural system in order to improve the profitability and competitiveness of local producers as well as the purchase power of consumers, specifically those of lower income”. Its new vision is “to be in charge of the merchandising process, contributing to the reduction of the margins of intermediation to benefit producers and consumers by working efficiently and with transparency”.

The institution's lineaments inside its new mission and vision are:
 Provide agricultural producers with the necessary storage infrastructure, through loans or leases, so they can face fluctuations in the market behavior.
 Promote the creation of markets in which national agricultural producers can sell their products, benefitting themselves and consumers by diminishing intermediaries.
 Identify and promote new investment opportunities in the agricultural sector.
 Stablish capacitation centers for producers to increase their ability to manage agricultural commercialization.
 Reinforce the institution's role as a mediator in the agricultural sector, to help solve conflicts between interest groups.
 Promote the creation of packaging centers in production zones to increase the added value to agricultural production.

Accomplishments 
Under Jorge Radhamés Zorrilla Ozuna´s administration, INESPRE has benefitted consumers, guaranteeing fair prices to agricultural products and strengthening local producers' trust by protecting them from sudden price fluctuations in products of massive consumption. Other accomplishments include:
 Bigger diversity of products sold through INESPRE
 Reduction of price speculation by distributing products effectively, using as an element of market stabilization the direct sell to consumers of lower income.
 Creation of more than 1,500 jobs 
 Creation of more than 2,072 programs including the “Mercados de Productores”, “Bodegas Fijas”, “Bodegas Móviles”, and “Agromercados”.
 More than 3 million people have been benefitted with the execution of the program PROCOMER 
 More than 2,235 local producers have been benefitted

References 

1969 establishments in the Dominican Republic
Agriculture in the Dominican Republic
Government agencies established in 1969
Price controls
Regulation in the Dominican Republic